"The Final Episode (Let's Change the Channel)" is a song by British metalcore band Asking Alexandria. It is the band's lead single from their debut album, Stand Up and Scream. It was released on 15 December 2009. One of the band's most successful songs, the single was certified gold by the RIAA in March 2014.

Music video 
The music video shows the band playing in a room. Also shown is a table, on which stands a cup of tea. Throughout the video, the cup gradually shifts to the edge of the table and finally falls down and breaks in the end.

Track listing

Personnel 
 Danny Worsnop – lead vocals, keyboards, programming
 Ben Bruce – lead guitar, backing vocals, keyboards, programming
 Cameron Liddell – rhythm guitar
 Sam Bettley – bass
 James Cassells – drums

Certifications

References 

2009 singles
Asking Alexandria songs
2009 songs
Songs written by Ben Bruce
Songs written by Danny Worsnop
Sumerian Records singles